Søren Ejlersgård Christensen (born 29 June 1986) is a retired Danish professional footballer. 

Christensen has amassed a total 50 youth caps for Denmark under six different age groups. He retired from football in June 2021.

International career
6 December 2011, Christensen was called up for Denmark's tour of Thailand in January.

Honours

Club
 Danish Superliga:
 Winners: 2011–12
 Danish Cup:
 Winners (2): 2009–10, 2010–11

References

Søren Christensen rykker til Kroatien, bold.dk, 15 February 2016

External links
 
 Profile at DBU.dk 
 Profile at Danmarks Radio 

1986 births
Living people
Danish men's footballers
Denmark under-21 international footballers
Denmark youth international footballers
FC Nordsjælland players
Danish Superliga players
FK Haugesund players
NK Slaven Belupo players
Nykøbing FC players
Eliteserien players
Croatian Football League players
Danish expatriate men's footballers
Expatriate footballers in Norway
Expatriate footballers in Croatia
Danish expatriate sportspeople in Norway
Danish expatriate sportspeople in Croatia
Association football midfielders